George Bretnall (September 11, 1895 – March 20, 1974) was an American sprinter. He competed in the men's 4 × 400 metres relay at the 1920 Summer Olympics.

References

1895 births
1974 deaths
Athletes (track and field) at the 1920 Summer Olympics
American male sprinters
Olympic track and field athletes of the United States
Place of birth missing